Pierre Toulgouat (14 July 1901 – 13 April 1992) was a French sculptor. His work was part of the sculpture event in the art competition at the 1932 Summer Olympics.

References

1901 births
1992 deaths
20th-century French sculptors
French male sculptors
Olympic competitors in art competitions
People from Eure